Buffalo County is a county located in the U.S. state of Wisconsin. As of the 2020 census, the population was 13,317. Its county seat is Alma. The county was created in 1853 and organized the following year.

History

Buffalo County, founded in 1853, is named for the Buffalo River, which flows from Strum to Alma, where it empties into the Mississippi River. The Buffalo River obtained its name from the French voyager Father Louis Hennepin, who named it Riviere des Boeufs in 1680.  The first permanent settlement was established in 1839, located in what is now Fountain City.  This settlement was originally named Holmes' Landing after a family who traded with the Sioux and Chippewa.  Buffalo County was settled primarily by Swiss, German, and Norwegian immigrants who were drawn to the area by the growing lumber industry, fertile soils, access to the Mississippi, and available land.  By 1848, a second community was established called Twelve Mile Bluff, which is now known as Alma.

Agriculture developed during the 1850s on top of the ridges where natural prairies and oak savannas occurred, which made working the land much easier.  With the lack of good roads, settlement remained along the Mississippi River, where farmers could ship their grain on steamboats.  The development of the Northern Rail from Winona, Minnesota, allowed for development away from the river, and by 1890, farmers were transporting their goods predominantly by rail.

The Civil War gave a boost to the local economy with the rising demand for wheat, which was the main crop of the county.  The postwar period brought a large influx of settlers; however, because of declining soil fertility, many moved west rather than adopt crop rotation and fertilization.  With the price of wheat falling, farmers turned to dairy farming, and by the 1880s, local creameries had started to appear.

Geography

Adjacent counties
 Pepin County – north
 Eau Claire County – northeast
 Trempealeau County – east
 Winona County, Minnesota – south
 Wabasha County, Minnesota – west

Major highways

Railroads
BNSF

Buses
List of intercity bus stops in Wisconsin

Demographics

2020 census
As of the census of 2020, the population was 13,317. The racial makeup of the county was 95.0% White, 0.3% Black or African American, 0.3% Native American, 0.2% Asian, 0.1% Pacific Islander, 1.1% from other races, and 3.0% from two or more races. Ethnically, the population was 2.5% Hispanic or Latino of any race.

2000 census

As of the census of 2000, there were 13,804 people, 5,511 households, and 3,780 families residing in the county. The population density was 20 people per square mile (8/km2). There were 6,098 housing units at an average density of 9 per square mile (3/km2). The racial makeup of the county was 98.69% White, 0.12% Black or African American, 0.30% Native American, 0.33% Asian, 0.02% Pacific Islander, 0.08% from other races, and 0.46% from two or more races. 0.62% of the population were Hispanic or Latino of any race. 44.3% were of German, 22.1% Norwegian and 8.8% Polish ancestry. 96.9% spoke English, 1.6% Spanish and 1.1% German as their first language.

There were 5,511 households, out of which 30.80% had children under the age of 18 living with them, 58.90% were married couples living together, 6.20% had a female householder with no husband present, and 31.40% were non-families. 27.10% of all households were made up of individuals, and 12.60% had someone living alone who was 65 years of age or older. The average household size was 2.47 and the average family size was 3.01.

In the county, the population was spread out, with 25.10% under the age of 18, 6.90% from 18 to 24, 27.60% from 25 to 44, 23.70% from 45 to 64, and 16.80% who were 65 years of age or older. The median age was 39 years. For every 100 females there were 100.70 males. For every 100 females age 18 and over, there were 101.40 males.

In 2017, there were 121 births, giving a general fertility rate of 58.4 births per 1000 women aged 15–44, the 22nd lowest rate out of all 72 Wisconsin counties. 33 of the births were to unmarried mothers, 88 to married mothers. Additionally, there were fewer than five reported induced abortions performed on women of Buffalo County residence in 2017.

Communities

Cities
 Alma (county seat)
Buffalo City
Fountain City
 Mondovi

Villages
 Cochrane
 Nelson

Towns

 Alma
 Belvidere
 Buffalo
 Canton
 Cross
 Dover
 Gilmanton
 Glencoe
 Lincoln
 Maxville
 Milton
 Modena
 Mondovi
 Montana
 Naples
 Nelson
 Waumandee

Census-designated places
 Gilmanton
 Waumandee

Other unincorporated communities

 Bluff Siding
 Cream
 Czechville
 East Winona
 Glencoe
 Herold
 Lookout
 Marshland
 Maxville
 Misha Mokwa
 Modena
 Montana
 Praag
 Tell
 Trevino
 Urne

Ghost towns/neighborhoods
 Anchorage
 Bohri
 Savoy
 Springdale

Politics

Notable people
 Chauncey H. Cooke (1846–1919), American soldier in the U.S. Civil War

See also
 National Register of Historic Places listings in Buffalo County, Wisconsin
 Trempealeau National Wildlife Refuge
 Upper Mississippi River National Wildlife and Fish Refuge

References

Further reading
 Biographical History of La Crosse, Trempealeau and Buffalo Counties, Wisconsin. Chicago: Lewis Publishing, 1892.
 Curtiss-Wedge, Franklyn (ed.). History of Buffalo and Pepin Counties Wisconsin. Winona, Minn.: H. C. Cooper, 1919.
 Kessinger, L. History of Buffalo County, Wisconsin. Alma, Wis.: 1888.

External links

 Buffalo County government website
 Buffalo County map from the Wisconsin Department of Transportation

 
1854 establishments in Wisconsin
Populated places established in 1854
Wisconsin counties on the Mississippi River